Schnitz un knepp, often spelled Schnitz un Gnepp, is a popular main dish item in the cuisine of the Pennsylvania Dutch and rural families. It is basically a dish of ham or pork shoulder with dried apples and dumplings. Apple schnitz are dried slices of apples, and knepp (from German "Knöpfe" for "buttons") are rivels (dumplings).

Although the Amish arrived in the early 18th century, this food was not common until the early 19th century, when Johnny Appleseed planted many orchards on the frontier of Pennsylvania, Ohio, and Indiana.  At the time, home canning was not yet practical, so the apple crop was preserved in liquid form (most commonly as hard cider) or sliced and dried, the finished slices being called snitz.

Apples other than named varieties grafted from a parent tree, were usually small, misshapen and rather tart - because of Johnny Appleseed's Swedenborgian faith, he sold only ungrafted trees - but drying the snitz concentrates the fruit sugars, making them a bright spot in an otherwise dreary diet.

Today, commercial producers of apple snitz use named-variety apples that cannot be sold as fresh because of blemishes, and they peel the apples. The peelings do not go to waste; they are pressed for cider. Some home orchards may have a tree that produces tart apples, prized for the flavorful snitz they make.  They may also choose to only core and slice their apples, not peeling them.

The dish uses rivels made from flour, milk, baking powder, butter, salt, and eggs, and the dish is flavored with ham, traditionally salt-cured "country ham", although honey ham, pork butt, or other pork may be used. Onions, potatoes, cloves, cinnamon and brown sugar are optional ingredients. An alternative knepp is a yeast dumpling made without sugar.

This recipe calls for long cooking, and is thus a winter dish.

The pronunciation is "snitz-en-nep".

See also
 List of ham dishes

References

Pennsylvania Dutch cuisine
Apple dishes
Ham dishes